Miasageori Station is a station on the Seoul Subway Line 4. Its name means "four-way junction in Mia-dong." It is located in Mia-dong, Gangbuk-gu, Seoul. It was previously called Miasamgeori (미아삼거리), until December 26, 2013.

Station layout

References 

Seoul Metropolitan Subway stations
Railway stations in South Korea opened in 1985
Metro stations in Gangbuk District